Michaëlla Krajicek and Maria Sanchez were the defending champions, but Krajicek chose not to participate. Sanchez chose to partner Jovana Jakšić, but they lost in the first round to Sabrina Santamaria and Carol Zhao.

Tara Moore and Conny Perrin won the title after defeating Viktorija Golubic and Amra Sadiković 6–3, 6–3 in the final.

Seeds

Draw

References
Main Draw

Coleman Vision Tennis Championships - Doubles